Big TV may refer to:

Big TV (Indonesia), a subscription television station in Indonesia
Reliance Digital TV, formerly Reliance Big TV, an Indian pay TV provider
Big TV (album), an album by White Lies
The former independent branding of WBGT-CD.